Three vessels of the Royal Navy have been named HMS Barbette for the barbette

HMS Barbette was the French privateer , launched in 1801 that the Royal Navy captured in 1805. She was renamed but never commissioned and was broken up in 1811.
 was a Bar-class boom defence vessel launched on 15 December 1937, that prior to 1939 served with the Royal Navy's Eastern Fleet, and was sold to the Turkish Navy on 3 March 1941.
 was a  launched on 18 June 1943 and broken up in Belgium in 1965

See also

References

Royal Navy ship names